"The Call" is a song by American boy band Backstreet Boys. It was released on February 6, 2001, as the second single from their album Black & Blue (2000).

Composition
The song is based on  common time, the tempo is 104 BPM and is played in the key of B-flat minor (with a key change to C minor). According to the sheet music published at Musicnotes.com by Universal Music Publishing Group, their vocal range spans from the low note F4 to the high note of Ab5.

The song's bass sound is the sound of Howie Dorough's flatulence while recording the vocals, which producer Max Martin then turned into his signature bass sound. In 2017, Dorough said of the incident: "I got in the booth, was breathing in really heavily singing my part, and I guess some extra air kind of came out. It made everybody laugh, and Max decided to take that and sample it to turn it into the 'dun dun dun, dun dun dun dun.'"

Music video

Background
The music video for "The Call" was directed by Francis Lawrence. For the video version of the song was edited to extend the length of the song. Additional telephone rings were added at the start, and one measure was added to both the break following the second chorus, and the subsequent a cappella choral segment. A third repeat of the final chorus was also added.

There were two cuts of the video released. One featured the modified version, and the second featured the Neptunes Remix. The two versions were substantially the same, however the differing arrangements of the two song versions resulted in the video being slightly re-edited to match. The Neptunes video also adds flashes of early in the video as callbacks near the end of the video; there is also an unreleased remix video using the Thunderpuss Club Mix and the Thunderdub of the song. Band member AJ McLean later admitted on The Oprah Winfrey Show, in an episode discussing his recovery from depression and drug and alcohol abuse, that he tried cocaine for the first time on the set of this video.  The music video won at the MTV Asia Awards in 2002 for Favorite Video. The song also received two nominations at the 2001 MTV Video Music Awards.

Synopsis
Complementing the lyrics to the song, the video tells the story of a man who is unfaithful to his girlfriend.  He meets another lady in a nightclub and leaves the club with her instead of going home to his girlfriend (whom he calls to make up an excuse for being late home). The cheating man is portrayed progressively by each of the five members of the Backstreet Boys.

Track listing

 European maxi single
 "The Call" (Radio Version) – 3:24
 "Shape of My Heart" (Soul Solution Radio Mix) – 2:56
 "Shape of My Heart" (Soul Solution Club Mix) – 7:03

 The Call (Remixes) European maxi single
 "The Call" (Radio Version) – 3:24
 "The Call" (Fragma Remix) – 6:05
 "The Call" (Tom Novy Remix) – 6:16
 "The Call" (Neptunes Remix with Pharrell and Clipse) - 3:56
 "The Call" (Kruger Mix) – 5:22
 "The Call" (Thunderpuss Radio Edit) – 3:10
 "The Call" (Thunderpuss Club Mix) – 8:26
 "The Call" (Thunderdub) – 8:03

 The Call (Neptunes Remixes) 12" promo single
 "The Call" (Neptunes Remix with Rap) – 3:53
 "The Call" (Remix Without Rap) – 3:55
 "The Call" (Earthone III Remix) – 3:43

Credits and personnel
Credits adapted from the European maxi single's liner notes.

Max Martin – songwriter, producer, recording, mixer
Rami – songwriter, producer, recording, mixer
John Amatiello – assistant recording engineer, Pro Tools engineer
Henrik Janson – guitar
Stockholm Session Strings – strings
Tom Coyne – mastering

Charts

Weekly charts

Year-end charts

Certifications

See also
List of Romanian Top 100 number ones of the 2000s

References

2000 songs
2001 singles
Backstreet Boys songs
Jive Records singles
Song recordings produced by Rami Yacoub
Song recordings produced by Max Martin
Songs written by Max Martin
Songs written by Rami Yacoub
Music videos directed by Francis Lawrence
Number-one singles in Romania
UK Independent Singles Chart number-one singles
Songs about telephone calls